is a Japanese badminton player. She won bronze in the mixed team at the Asian Junior Championships in 2013 and 2014, and competed at the 2014 World Junior Championships, winning two bronzes in the mixed doubles and team event. Higashino won her maiden Super 1000 tournament at the 2018 and 2021 All England Open in the mixed doubles event, partnering with Yuta Watanabe, and also won the bronze medal in the mixed doubles at the 2020 Summer Olympics.

Career 

Higashino was born in Iwamizawa, graduated from the Tomioka Senior High School, and joined the Unisys team in 2015. 

Together with Watanabe, they reached the 2018 All England Open final beating the top three seeds, and clinched the title after beating the fifth seeded pair from China Zheng Siwei and Huang Yaqiong in the rubber game. This was their first World Tour title.

In March 2021, Higashino and Watanabe won the mixed doubles title in the All England Open. In July, she and Watanabe competed at the 2020 Summer Olympics, and clinched a bronze medal after winning the bronze medal game against Tang Chun Man and Tse Ying Suet in straight games.

Achievements

Olympic Games 
Mixed doubles

BWF World Championships 
Mixed doubles

Asian Championships 
Mixed doubles

BWF World Junior Championships 
Mixed doubles

BWF World Tour (9 titles, 7 runners-up) 
The BWF World Tour, which was announced on 19 March 2017 and implemented in 2018, is a series of elite badminton tournaments sanctioned by the Badminton World Federation (BWF). The BWF World Tour is divided into levels of World Tour Finals, Super 1000, Super 750, Super 500, Super 300, and the BWF Tour Super 100.

Mixed doubles

BWF Grand Prix (1 runner-up) 
The BWF Grand Prix had two levels, the Grand Prix and Grand Prix Gold. It was a series of badminton tournaments sanctioned by the Badminton World Federation (BWF) and played between 2007 and 2017.

Mixed doubles

  BWF Grand Prix Gold tournament
  BWF Grand Prix tournament

BWF International Challenge/Series (1 title) 
Mixed doubles

  BWF International Challenge tournament
  BWF International Series tournament
  BWF Future Series tournament

References

External links 
 

1996 births
Living people
People from Iwamizawa, Hokkaido
Sportspeople from Hokkaido
Japanese female badminton players
Badminton players at the 2020 Summer Olympics
Olympic badminton players of Japan
Olympic bronze medalists for Japan
Olympic medalists in badminton
Medalists at the 2020 Summer Olympics
Badminton players at the 2018 Asian Games
Asian Games gold medalists for Japan
Asian Games medalists in badminton
Medalists at the 2018 Asian Games
20th-century Japanese women
21st-century Japanese women
World No. 1 badminton players